Wanderley is a municipality in the state of Bahia in the North-East region of Brazil. It has a population of roughly 12000 people. It is very dependent on the agricultural industry in the region with a large portion of the people owning cattle. In the centre of the city there is a church, a market, and an abandoned gas station. It is approximately 2 hours from the main city in the region, Barreiras, and eleven hours driving from the capital of the state Bahia, Salvador. It also 9 hours from the Brazilian capital, 
Significant Points
There are several significant points in Wanderley.
 •Praca Do Milho
 •Panificadora E Mercearia Central

See also
List of municipalities in Bahia

References

Municipalities in Bahia